Cecilia Samartin (born 1961 in Havana, Cuba) is a Cuban-American writer and psychologist. She studied psychology at UCLA and marriage and family therapy at Santa Clara University.

For several years she has been working with people who have immigrated to the United States from countries in Latin America.

Samartin has also been translated into Dutch, Finnish, German, French, Norwegian, Danish, and Swedish.

Samartin had a book tour in Norway in 2009; she has topped the bestseller list there for over two years.

She lives in San Gabriel, California, with her British-born husband.

Bibliography

 Broken Paradise / Ghost Heart (2004)
 Tarnished Beauty / Señor Peregrino (2005)
 Vigil / Salvadorena (2009)

References

External links

Official website
 Juritzen - Norwegian publisher
 Simon and Schuster - United States publisher
 Interview with author

American women psychologists
21st-century American psychologists
21st-century American novelists
21st-century American women writers
American women novelists
21st-century Cuban novelists
Cuban women novelists
1961 births
Living people
20th-century American psychologists